The Asian Swimming Championships are a major aquatics event, held every four years among the athletes from Asian countries. It is conducted under the governance of the Asian Amateur Swimming Federation, the governing body of aquatics in Asia.

The last edition of the Championships, the tenth; were held in 2016 in Tokyo, Japan.

Editions

Championships Records
All records were set in finals unless noted otherwise. All times are swum in a long-course (50m) pool.

Men

|-bgcolor=#DDDDDD
|colspan=9|
|-

|-bgcolor=#DDDDDD
|colspan=9|
|-

|-bgcolor=#DDDDDD
|colspan=9|
|-

|-bgcolor=#DDDDDD
|colspan=9|
|-

|-bgcolor=#DDDDDD
|colspan=9|
|-

Women

|-bgcolor=#DDDDDD
|colspan=9|
|-

|-bgcolor=#DDDDDD
|colspan=9|
|-

|-bgcolor=#DDDDDD
|colspan=9|
|-

|-bgcolor=#DDDDDD
|colspan=9|
|-

|-bgcolor=#DDDDDD
|colspan=9|
|-

See also
 Swimming at the Asian Games
 Diving at the Asian Games
 Synchronized swimming at the Asian Games
 Water polo at the Asian Games
 Asian Water Polo Championship

References

Swimming competitions in Asia
Swimming Championships
International water polo competitions
Swimming
Quadrennial sporting events
Recurring sporting events established in 1980